Svarozero is a rural locality (a village) in Ukhotskoye Rural Settlement of Kargopolsky District, Arkhangelsk Oblast, Russia. The population was 25 as of 2010.

Geography 
Svarozero is located 73 km south of Kargopol (the district's administrative centre) by road. Medvedevo is the nearest rural locality.

References 

Rural localities in Kargopolsky District